The 9th British Independent Film Awards, held in November 2006 at the Hammersmith Palais, London, honoured the best British independent films of 2006.

Awards

Best British Independent Film
 This Is England
 The Last King of Scotland
 The Queen
 Red Road
 The Wind That Shakes the Barley

Best Director
 Kevin Macdonald - The Last King of Scotland
 Stephen Frears - The Queen
 Michael Caton-Jones - Shooting Dogs
 Shane Meadows - This Is England
 Ken Loach - The Wind That Shakes the Barley

The Douglas Hickox Award
Given to a British director on their debut feature
 Menhaj Huda - KiDULTHOOD
 Caradog W. James - Little White Lies
 Paul Andrew Williams - London to Brighton
 Andrea Arnold - Red Road
 Tom Vaughan - Starter for 10

Best Actor
 Tony Curran - Red Road
 James McAvoy - The Last King of Scotland
 Forest Whitaker - The Last King of Scotland
 Peter O'Toole - Venus
 Cillian Murphy - The Wind That Shakes the Barley

Best Actress
 Kate Dickie - Red Road
 Juliette Binoche - Breaking and Entering
 Robin Wright - Breaking and Entering
 Frances de la Tour - The History Boys
 Helen Mirren - The Queen

Best Supporting Actor/Actress
 Leslie Phillips - Venus
 Martin Compston - Red Road
 Joseph Gilgun - This Is England
 Stephen Graham - This Is England
 Vanessa Redgrave - Venus

Best Screenplay
 Peter Morgan - The Queen
 Alan Bennett - The History Boys
 Peter Morgan and Jeremy Brock - The Last King of Scotland
 Shane Meadows - This Is England
 Hanif Kureishi - Venus

Most Promising Newcomer
 Thomas Turgoose - This Is England
 Rafi Gavron - Breaking and Entering
 Harry Treadaway and Luke Treadaway - Brothers of the Head
 Samuel Barnett - The History Boys
 Dominic Cooper - The History Boys
 Jodie Whittaker - Venus

Best Achievement in Production
 London to Brighton
 KiDULTHOOD
 The Road to Guantanamo
 Severance
 Shooting Dogs

Best Technical Achievement
 Anthony Dod Mantle - The Last King of Scotland (for cinematography)
 Alan MacDonald - The Queen (for production design)
 Daniel Phillips - The Queen (for makeup)
 Ludovico Einaudi - This Is England (for original music)
 Barry Ackroyd - The Wind That Shakes the Barley (for cinematography)

Best British Documentary
 The Road to Guantanamo
 Blindsight
 The Great Happiness Space: Tale of an Osaka Love Thief
 The Pervert's Guide to Cinema
 Unknown White Male

Best British Short
 Cubs
 The 10th Man
 At the End of the Sentence
 Ex Memoria
 Who I Am and What I Want

Best 15 Second Short
 'What's the Point?
 Ah, Youth
 Chrysanthemums the Word
 Death of the Dinosaurs
 Fate and Mr. McKinley

Best Foreign Film
 Caché - (France)
 Brick - (USA)
 The Beat That My Heart Skipped - (France)
 Hard Candy - (USA)
 Volver - (Spain)

The Raindance Award
 Ballad of AJ Weberman London to Brighton Scenes of a Sexual Nature''

The Richard Harris Award
 Jim Broadbent

Special Jury Prize
 Ken Loach

Entertainment Personality Award
 Helen Mirren

External links
 BIFA Homepage

References
 IMDB

British Independent Film Awards
2006 in British cinema
2006 film awards
2006 in London
November 2006 events in the United Kingdom